Bordj Tamentfoust is an Ottoman fort in the city of Tamentfoust, Algeria. The fort is among several Ottoman forts built during the Ottoman rule of Algeria, which were established to guard the city of Algiers. With the exception of Bordj Tamentfoust, most of the forts no longer exist or in a good condition. The fort was built on the highest point of Tamentfoust, at the eastern end of the Bay of Algiers.

History
It was commissioned in 1661 during the rule of Ismail Pasha, on the part of Agha Ramadan. It was later renovated in 1685 by Hussein Mozomorto, a dey hailed from Italy. The exact date of construction is remain contested. French historian Émile Boutin says that it was built in 1685 in response to the French military campaign led by Abraham Duquesne of bombing the city of Algiers. Another French historian Georges Marçais says that it was built in 1722 under the rule of the dey Muhammad Pasha.

The fort had faced the French raids several times, led by Jean II d'Estrées under the order of Louis XIV in 1688. On July 23, 1830, the official declaration of jihad against France took place in the fort, in which chiefs of several tribes in the area had gathered together, including Banu Hilal, Bani al-Khashana and Bani al-Sabt.

Architecture
It is octagonal-shaped, and contains twelve rooms, eleven of which are distributed into three groups over seven sides surrounding the yard. One of the rooms is set up as a prayer room and contains mihrab without any decorations. Above these rooms is surface with barricades which have porthole in them. The wall is built from large stones, and the height of the fort reaches around nine meters measuring from the bottom of the moat. The fort was adjoined with another fort called "Bordj al-Ingliz" which was equipped with a moat as well.

Gallery

References

17th-century establishments in Africa
Buildings and structures in Algiers Province
Castles in Algeria
Ottoman fortifications